The Selangor order of precedence is a nominal and symbolic hierarchy of important positions within the state of Selangor. It has no legal standing but is used to dictate ceremonial protocol at events of a state nature.

Order of precedence

See also 
 List of post-nominal letters (Selangor)

References 

Orders of precedence in Malaysia
Government of Selangor